Leuconycta is a genus of moths of the family Noctuidae. The genus was first described by George Hampson in 1909.

Species
Leuconycta diphteroides (Guenée, 1852)
Leuconycta lepidula (Grote, 1874)
Leuconycta vesta (Schaus, 1894)

References

Acontiinae